"Smash Hits" is the debut single by Kid Canaveral. It was released by Straight to Video Records on 3 March 2007. The single was remixed with a re-recorded vocal at Chem 19 Studios for the digital download version and album version of the single. "Smash Hits" is included on the 2010 Kid Canaveral album, Shouting at Wildlife. A video for the song was made by the BBC for "The Music Show" and was broadcast on BBC 2 Scotland in November 2006.

Track listing
A. "Smash Hits"
B. "So Close to Beautiful"

References 

2007 singles
2007 songs